Dolichoderus scrobiculatus is a species of ant in the genus Dolichoderus. Described by Mayr in 1876, the species is endemic to Australia.

References

Dolichoderus
Hymenoptera of Australia
Insects described in 1876